Latabai Chandrakant Sonawane is an Indian politician. She was elected as Member of the Maharashtra Legislative Assembly for Chopda in October 2019. She received 78137 votes as a member of Shiv Sena Party.

References

Living people
21st-century Indian politicians
Shiv Sena politicians
Women in Maharashtra politics
Year of birth missing (living people)
21st-century Indian women politicians